Robert Jardine (12 January 1812 – 16 June 1866) was a Scottish-Canadian businessman and railroad promoter in Saint John, New Brunswick, Canada.

Originally from Girvan, Ayrshire, Scotland, Jardine emigrated to Canada in the 1830s. He became involved in the grocery business and, with his brother Alexander, developed Jardine and Company into a significant import business. At the same time he was involved in a number of high-profile businesses and organizations in Saint John. In 1854 there was a cholera epidemic and he was president of the Saint John Water Company at the time. He established a pure water system that earned him a civic commendation. The system proved its worth for decades.

Jardine was the chief commissioner of railways in New Brunswick from 1857 until 1865.

References 

 Material sourced from New Brunswick Provincial Archives

1812 births
1866 deaths
People from South Ayrshire
Scottish emigrants to Canada
Canadian railway executives
Businesspeople from New Brunswick
19th-century Scottish businesspeople